Laloux is a surname. Notable people with the surname include:

André Laloux (1892–date of death unknown), Belgian tennis player
François Laloux (1890–date of death unknown), Belgian tennis player
René Laloux (1929–2004), French animator, screenwriter and film director
Victor Laloux (1850–1937), French architect and teacher
Frederic Laloux, French economist who coined the term Teal organisation